Marcgravia evenia is a species of flowering vine in the family Marcgraviaceae. Within this family it belongs to the Galetae group, which is characterized by a long inflorescence axis and boat shaped nectaries. The plant is endemic to Cuba.

Bat ecology
Marcgravia evenia relies on Monophyllus, a Cuban nectar-feeding bat, for pollination. 
This plant has evolved bowl shaped leaves which act as reflectors for a bat's biosonar. This helps the bats to find the plants with greater ease and hence pollinate them with more frequency. The shape of the leaves also helps to guide the bats in locating the hidden feeders. The reflectors are convergent with those of a Bornean pitcher plant, Nepenthes hemsleyana, that attracts bats to its pitchers as roosting sites and uses bat guano as a source of nutrition.

References

External links
 
 
 
 
 

evenia
Endemic flora of Cuba
Vines